Emma Liddell (born 30 March 1980) is a former Australian cricketer.

Liddell played 80 Women's National Cricket League matches for the New South Wales Breakers. She also played three Tests and 33 One Day Internationals for the Australia national women's cricket team. She was the 141st woman to play Test cricket for Australia, and the 95th woman to play One Day International cricket for Australia.

Liddell attended Grantham High School, in Sydney's western suburbs. She took up playing cricket at the age of 14, following her brother into the sport. In February 1996, aged 15, she turned out for a representative Metropolitan West side at the annual New South Wales Combined High Schools Cricket Championships, held in Penrith. On the first day of the tournament, in a match against Metropolitan East, she dismissed the entire opposing side without conceding a run, finishing with figures of 10/0 from 7.4 overs. All her victims were clean-bowled, with the team as a whole scoring only seven runs. The feat is one of the rarest in cricket – only 24 instances have been recorded across all levels of the game, with Liddell the only woman known to have completed it.

References

Living people
Australia women Test cricketers
Australia women One Day International cricketers
1980 births
Sportswomen from New South Wales
Cricketers from Sydney